Aspartate aminotransferase, cytoplasmic is an enzyme that in humans is encoded by the GOT1 gene.

Glutamic-oxaloacetic transaminase is a pyridoxal phosphate-dependent enzyme which exists in cytoplasmic and mitochondrial forms, GOT1 and GOT2, respectively.  GOT plays a role in amino acid metabolism and the urea and tricarboxylic acid cycles. The two enzymes are homodimeric and show close homology.

Interactive pathway map

References

Further reading